Frederik Ørsøe Christensen (born 7 June 2002) is a Danish footballer who plays as a midfielder for Danish 1st Division club FC Fredericia.

Career

Youth career
Born in Ikast, Ørsøe started his career Ikast KFUM, before joining Ikast FS and later, at the age of 13, FC Midtjylland.

Viborg
After two season with the U-19 team of Midtjylland, Christensen signed a one-year contract with newly promoted Danish Superliga club Viborg FF on 10 June 2021. Christensen got his official debut for Viborg on 2 September 2019 in a Danish Cup game against FC Fredericia, where he played 76 minutes.

Christensen got his Danish Superliga debut on 28 November 2021 against SønderjyskE. In May 2022 Viborg confirmed, that Christensen would leave the club by the end of June 2022, as his contract had come to an end.

FC Fredericia
On 6 July 2022 it was confirmed, that Christensen had joined Danish 1st Division club FC Fredericia on a one-year deal. Christensen got his debut on 23 July 2022 against Nykøbing FC in the league.

References

External links

Frederik Ørsøe Christensen at DBU

2002 births
Living people
Danish men's footballers
Association football midfielders
Denmark youth international footballers
Danish Superliga players
Danish 1st Division players
FC Midtjylland players
Viborg FF players
FC Fredericia players